Bodrugan is a Cornish surname and placename. It may refer to:

Surname
Henry Bodrugan (died 1308), Cornish landowner, knight and politician
Nicholas Bodrugan (born by 1521, died 1557 or 1584), alias Adams MP
Otto Bodrugan (died 1331), Cornish landowner, soldier and politician
William Bodrugan (disambiguation)
William Bodrugan (MP fl. 1420–33), MP for Cornwall
William Bodrugan (MP fl. 1384–1401), MP for Cornwall, Helston and Dunheved
William Bodrugan (MP died 1416), MP for Cornwall and Liskeard
William Bodrugan (priest), Archdeacon of Cornwall and Provost of Glasney College

Place

Bodrugan, Cornwall

Cornish-language surnames